Kota Tinggi District is a district in the Malaysian state of Johor. The population was 187,824 in 2010. The principal town is Kota Tinggi.

Geography
The district has an area of 3,482 km2. It is the largest district in Johor which covers 18.34% of the state area.

Main rivers that pass through the district are Johor River, Lebam River, Santi River, Sedili Besar River and Sedili Kecil River.

Demographics

According to the 2010 census, the population was 187,824 with  males and  females.

Governance

Administrative divisions 

The district land is subdivided into 10 administrative mukims:

Local governments 

The district is governed by two local authorities, namely Kota Tinggi District Council and Pengerang Municipal Council. Kota Tinggi District Council mainly governs the northern part of the district and encompasses the mukims of Kambau, Kota Tinggi, Sedili Besar, Ulu Sungai Johor and Ulu Sungai Sedili Besar. Meanwhile, Pengerang Municipal Council governs the southern part and encompasses the mukims of Johor Lama, Pantai Timur, Pengerang, Sedili Kecil and Tanjung Surat.

Federal and state representatives 
List of Kota Tinggi district representatives in the federal legislature Dewan Rakyat:

List of Kota Tinggi district representatives in the State Legislative Assembly:

Towns 
The primary towns in the district include:

 Bandar Penawar
 Bandar Tenggara
 Desaru
 Johor Lama
 Kota Tinggi
 Kuala Sedili
 Pengerang
 Sungai Rengit
 Tanjung Surat
 Teluk Sengat

Economy
The main economy activities in the district are ecotourism, agriculture, biotechnology, petrochemical and oil and gas.
60% of the district land is used for agriculture purpose. In Desaru, currently the Johor state government is developing an integrated tourism area which spreads over an area of 1,578 hectares.

Tourist attractions
 Kota Tinggi Museum
 Sultan Iskandar Reservoir
 Sultan Mahmud Mangkat Di Julang Mausoleum
 Tanjung Balau Fishermen Museum
 Desaru
 Kota Tinggi Waterfalls

Transportation
The district is served by TransJohor public buses linking Kota Tinggi Town to Larkin Sentral Terminal in Johor Bahru City and also other destinations within the district, such as Bandar Penawar.

See also 
 Kota Tinggi

References

External links 
 Kota Tinggi District Council official website